Yaqoob Ali (born 5 April 1980) is a Pakistani-born Irish cricketer. He made his Twenty20 cricket debut for Munster Reds in the 2017 Inter-Provincial Trophy on 26 May 2017. He was the leading wicket-taker in the 2018 Inter-Provincial Trophy tournament, with twelve dismissals in six matches.

References

External links
 

1980 births
Living people
Irish cricketers
Leinster Lightning cricketers
Munster Reds cricketers
Cricketers from Karachi
Pakistani emigrants to Ireland
Irish people of Pakistani descent